is a Japanese light novel series by Shūsuke Amagi, with illustrations by Miyū. A short story light novel series was serialized in Dragon Magazine. A manga adaptation drawn by Miyū is serialized in the shōnen manga magazine Dragon Age Pure. A second manga adaptation drawn by Nodoka Kiyose is serialized in the shōnen manga magazine Monthly Dragon Age. A third manga adaptation drawn by Watari is serialized in Beans Ace magazine. A four-panel comic strip adaptation drawn by Masumi Futaba started serialization in Monthly Dragon Age on November 8, 2008. A science fiction light novel series titled Legend of Regios is set in the past world of Chrome Shelled Regios series, and published by Fujimi Shobo under its Style-F label. An anime adaptation produced by Zexcs aired on January 11, 2009 to June 20, 2009 and is licensed in North America by Funimation Entertainment.

Plot

On an alternate reality Earth overrun with mutated nano-machine-beasts called Filth Monsters (Contaminoids in Funimation's translation), humanity is forced to live in large mobile cities called Regios and learn to use weapons called DITE (pronounced Di-Te) and harnessing the power of Kei to defend themselves. The truth is that these are people lost in an alternative reality caught between struggling as pawns of the founders of this space and those trying to destroy it. Only upon its destruction can everything revert to the real world. However, many generations have passed since the creation of the world and naturally the citizens who inhabit it fight for their lives. In the Academic City of Zuellni, Layfon Alseif is hoping to start a new life without Martial/Military arts and forget his past. However, his past has caught the attention of Kalian Loss, the Student Council President and Nina Antalk, a Military Arts student and Captain of the 17th Platoon, who instantly recognizes his abilities and decides he's the perfect candidate to join her group. The series follow Layfon's life in Zuellni and occasionally has flashbacks of his life in Glenden as a Heaven's Blade.

Media

Novels
The series finished with 25 light novel volumes - with 19 volumes of the main story-line and 6 being the side-story novels. The last 25th volume (which is an epilogue of the story) was published in September 2013 in Japan.

Anime

The anime adaptation started airing in January 2009 and was produced by Zexcs. At Anime Central 2010, North American anime distributor Funimation Entertainment announced that they have acquired the anime series.

The series made its North American television debut on September 19, 2011 on the Funimation Channel.

Reception
The light novels have sold over 5,000,000 copies.

References

External links
  
 Chrome Shelled Regios at Fujimi Shobo 
 Chrome Shelled Regios - The Official Anime Website  from FUNimation
 

Book series introduced in 2006
2006 Japanese novels
2007 Japanese novels
2007 manga
2008 manga
2009 Japanese novels
Anime and manga based on light novels
Fujimi Fantasia Bunko
Fujimi Shobo manga
Funimation
Japanese fantasy novels
Kadokawa Shoten manga
Kadokawa Dwango franchises
Light novels
Shōnen manga
Tokyo MX original programming
Zexcs